Tony Lagerström (born July 19, 1988) is a Swedish professional ice hockey player. 
He is currently playing with Gnesta IK in the Hockeytvåan, the fourth highest division of hockey in Sweden.

He was drafted by the Chicago Blackhawks in the third round of the 2006 NHL Entry Draft, 76th  overall. He began his youth career with Tullinge TP. He played a solitary game in the Swedish Hockey League with Södertälje SK during the 2005–06 season.

References

External links

1988 births
Living people
Chicago Blackhawks draft picks
Huddinge IK players
Mora IK players
Swedish ice hockey left wingers
Södertälje SK players
Ice hockey people from Stockholm